Dika Mem (born 31 August 1997) is a French handball player for FC Barcelona and the French national handball team.

Mem was a late starter, learning how to play at the age of 13. He began his career with French club Eaubonne, where he played until he was 15 years old. The following two seasons he was at Pôle Espoirs before one season at Saint Gratien. He made the jump to the handball elite at the age of 17 and in the 2015/16 season he made his debut with Tremblay. In his first season in the LNH, Mem scored 93 goals in 25 games. Prior to that, he had already tasted top competition, becoming a European champion with the U18 French National Team. Mem signed with FC Barcelona for six seasons, beginning in 2016/17.

He participated at the 2017 World Men's Handball Championship, where he won a gold medal with the French team.

Personal life
His brothers are basketball players.

Individual awards 
 All-Star Right Back of EHF Champions League: 2021, 2022

References

External links

1997 births
Living people
Handball players from Paris
French male handball players
Expatriate handball players
French expatriate sportspeople in Spain
FC Barcelona Handbol players
Liga ASOBAL players
Handball players at the 2020 Summer Olympics
Medalists at the 2020 Summer Olympics
Olympic gold medalists for France
Olympic medalists in handball